DeWitt Public Schools is a public school district located in DeWitt, MI.  Current enrollment of K-12 students is 2,900. Dr. Shanna Spickard is the current superintendent.

Schools
The district consists of six buildings:
 Fuerstenau Early Childhood Center serves the Little Panthers Preschool
 Schavey Road Elementary serves Kindergarten and 1st graders
 David Scott Elementary School serves 2nd and 3rd graders
 Herbison Woods School serves 4th and 5th Graders
 DeWitt Middle School serves 6th, 7th, and 8th Graders
 DeWitt High School serves 9th-12th Graders

Mascot and colors
DeWitt Public Schools' mascot is the Panther and the school colors are Blue and Gold.

Athletics
The Panthers have had some success in sports as well.  The Panther Baseball team has won 2 state titles, once in 1983 and then again in 1993.

The Football team had 3 straight trips to the Pontiac Silverdome in 2002, 2003 and 2004.  All three times they fell short and ended in 2nd place.

References

External links
 
 DeWitt Public School Foundation
 DeWitt High School Alumni Site

School districts in Michigan
Education in Clinton County, Michigan